The Communist Party of Brazil (Partido Comunista do Brasil, PC do B) has held twelve Congresses since it was founded in March 1922 as the Communist Party – Brazilian Section of the Communist International (Partido Comunista – Seção Brasileira da Internacional Comunista, PC-SBIC).

Communist Party of Brazil
Communism in Brazil
Brazil, Communist Party